Januarisman Runtuwene better known as Januarisman or Aris, (born January 25, 1985, in Jakarta, Indonesia) is an Indonesian rock singer. On August 2, 2008, he won the fifth season of the reality show Indonesian Idol. After winning a competition BMG Recordings terminated his contract while he was recording his first album. As of now, he has no singles or albums released. He has no plans to sue the company for terminating the contract.

Biography

Early life
Aris dropped out of school and became a street musician for financial reason when he was in middle school. He used perform in many public places such as Kampung Melayu bus station and KRL Jabotabek train. He was married to Rosalia Oktaviani and has one son named Mocalist Rasya Faturullah.

Indonesian Idol
Aris auditioned for Indonesian Idol in Jakarta.

He sang a song from an Indonesian band ST12,"Rasa Yang Tertinggal". Titi DJ, one of the judges, cried during Aris' performance.

Aris made it to the final and won season five of Indonesian Idol after defeating Gisella Anastasia.

List of Indonesian Idol performances

It was revealed that Aris received the most votes out of the Top 3

Discography

Singles

References

External links
 Arismania Website
 Arismania Blog

1985 births
Living people
Indonesian Muslims
Indonesian guitarists
Indonesian Idol winners
21st-century Indonesian male singers
Indonesian pop singers
Indonesian rock singers
Minahasa people
Singers from Jakarta
Sony BMG artists
21st-century guitarists